Chris McKinney  is an American writer born and raised in Hawaii.

Career
His novels are set in Hawaii and the plots often concern the difficulties of underprivileged people dealing with societal change. He is an associate professor in Language Arts at Honolulu Community College where he has taught since 2003.

McKinney was a fellow of the Hawai`i Writing Project in 1998 and the 2000 recipient of the Elliot Cades Award for Literature. His novel, The Tattoo, won first place awards for Excellence in Literature and Excellence in Writing Literature from The Hawai`i Book Publishers Association. His screenplay Paradise Broken was nominated for best film at the Los Angeles Pacific Film Festival. His latest novel, Midnight Water City was named a Best Mystery of 2021 by Publishers Weekly  and a Best Speculative Mystery of 2021 by CrimeReads

Personal life
McKinney was born in Honolulu and grew up in nearby Kahalu'u. His mother was Korean and his father was from Hawai'i. When he was a baby his parents divorced; they both remarried and his father moved to the US mainland, to Gaithersburg, Maryland and later Selma, California. From fourth to sixth grade, he spent the school year with his father and their new family, and summers in Hawaii with his mother and her family. He stopped going back to the mainland in 6th grade.

He attended Mid-Pacific Institute in Honolulu for high school and graduated from the University of Hawaiʻi with a B.A. in English. He has been married twice and has two children.

Legal issues
In 2019, McKinney was identified as a co-conspirator in the indictment of former Honolulu deputy prosecutor Katherine Kealoha, a family friend. Between 2015 and 2017, McKinney allegedly conspired with Rudy Puana, the brother of Katherine Kealoha, to illegally sell oxycodone pills, or use the pills to purchase cocaine.

Bibliography
 The Tattoo (1999)  
 The Queen of Tears (2001) 
 Bolohead Row (2005) 
 Mililani Mauka (2009) 
 Boi No Good (2012) 
 Red Headed Hawaiian: the inspiring story about a local boy from rural Hawaii who makes good (2014) 
 Yakudoshi: Age of Calamity (2016) 
 Midnight Water City (2021)

References

External links
Chris McKinney on PaperBackSwap
Chris McKinney on Amazon.com

Living people
Writers from Honolulu
Year of birth missing (living people)
University of Hawaiʻi at Mānoa alumni